Harry Edward Bolton (24 December 1870 – 18 August 1956) was an Australian politician. He was a member of the Western Australian Legislative Assembly from 1904 to 1917, as the member for North Fremantle until 1911 and for South Fremantle thereafter. He was initially a member of the Labor Party before joining the National Labor Party after the 1916 conscription split.

In 1906 he raised in parliament allegations against railways commissioner W. J. George that he had suppressed information on illegal activities of two senior railways officials John T. Short and George Alfred Julius. A royal commission dismissed the allegations.

Leonard Burlington Bolton, Liberal MLC who died in a car crash 1948, was a brother.

References

1870 births
1956 deaths
Members of the Western Australian Legislative Assembly
Place of birth missing
Australian Labor Party members of the Parliament of Western Australia
National Labor Party members of the Parliament of Western Australia